A total of 10 teams in each tournament (5 athletes per team) will qualify for a quota of 100 athletes in curling at the 2022 Winter Olympics. A further 10 mixed doubles pairs will qualify for a total of 20 athletes. Therefore, a total of 120 athletes can qualify in total to compete in the curling competitions.

Summary

Final summary

Six nations - Canada, Great Britain, Sweden, Switzerland and the United States, along with hosts China - achieved a maximum representation of 12 quota places across all three events, while, in total 14 NOCS are represented in the curling competition in Beijing. Although they competed in the 1992 demonstration event, this will be Australia's debut in curling as a full Olympic event.

Men

Women

Mixed doubles

Qualification System
The 2022 Winter Olympics is scheduled to feature ten-team fields for each of the three tournaments (men's, women's, and mixed doubles). This will be an increase from the eight-team mixed doubles field in 2018.

Prior to the COVID-19 pandemic, nations were to earn Olympic Qualification Points based on their performance at the 2020 and 2021 World Curling Championships. China (as the host nation) will receive an automatic berth in each discipline. The top seven other nations in the Olympic Qualification Point list for each discipline were also to receive positions in the Olympics. The remaining two positions in each tournament were to be awarded to the winners of an Olympic Qualification Event in late 2021.

This system was amended after 2020 World Curling Championships were cancelled due to the pandemic. Now only the 2021 world championship results are used for automatic qualification. The top six nations in the 2021 men's and women's world championships qualified for the Olympics, and the top seven nations in the 2021 World Mixed Doubles Curling Championship also qualified. China qualified for all three Olympic tournaments as the host nation. The remaining positions in the Olympic tournament will be awarded to the top nations in Olympic Qualification Events to be held in late 2021. All nations that qualified for world championships in 2020 or 2021 but have not already qualified for the Olympics will be eligible to compete in the Olympic Qualification Events, in addition to the top two (men's and women's) or three (mixed doubles) qualifiers in a Pre-Qualifier Event that is open to all other nations.

Qualification Timeline

Qualification Results

Men

Women

Mixed doubles

Note: Scotland, England and Wales all compete separately in international curling. By an agreement between the curling federations of those three home nations, only Scotland can qualify for the Olympics on behalf of Great Britain.

National qualifying events
Some countries select their teams through trial qualification tournaments.

 2021 Canadian Olympic Curling Trials
 2021 Japanese Olympic Curling Trials
 2021 Japanese mixed doubles curling Olympic trials
 2021 Korean Curling Championships
 2021 Korean Mixed Doubles Curling Championship
 2021 Russian mixed doubles curling Olympic trials
 2021 Swiss Olympic Curling Trials
 2021 United States Olympic Curling Trials
 2021 United States mixed doubles curling Olympic trials

References

External links
Official World Curling Federation Olympic qualification page with tables and linked source documents.

Qualification for the 2022 Winter Olympics
Qualification
Sports events affected by the COVID-19 pandemic